Helen Evans Ramsaran (born May 11, 1943) is an American sculptor.  Her work explores the primordial world of ancient rituals, mysterious fossilized remains, mystic forces, and African inspired architecture. Ramsaran's work was first inspired by a trip to Africa in 1981, and although her sculpture is inanimate, there is a lurking sense of humanity's presence. Her recent work explores the effects of climate change on life sustaining systems and resources, specifically marine ecosystems and plant and animal species.

Early life and education
Helen Ramsaran was born in Bryan, Texas in 1943. She received a Bachelor of Science degree in Art Education (1965) and a Masters of Fine Art in sculpture (1968) from Ohio State University, where she studied bronze casting under David Black and welding with John Freeman. From 1968-69, Ramsaran taught at Florida A&M University and later at Bowie State University in Maryland from 1970 to 1973. She studied photography at the New School for Social Research in New York (1973–74), and anatomical drawing at the Art Students League in New York from 1975-1976. Ramsaran retired as an Associate Professor of Art at John Jay College of the City of University of New York in 2008.

Career and artistic style
Ramsaran moved to New York City in 1973.  Shortly thereafter (1978), she created a series of bronze relief sculptures called Visual Tales. This is her only series that is autobiographical in its statement and assumes the form of a visual narrative.  The images and forms are somewhat calligraphic, thus posing some very delicate and challenging casting problems.  In executing this body of work at the Johnson Atelier Technical Institute of Sculpture in Princeton, New Jersey, Ramsaran was able to perfect the technique of casting very delicate bronze sculptures.

In the 1980s, Ramsaran's work took a major shift and developed into an exploration of ancient rituals, ancient African oral traditions, ancient myths, mysterious fossilized remains, supernatural power, and African inspired architecture.  Although her sculpture during this period and beyond is inanimate, there is a lurking sense of humanity's presence. The subtle carvings on many of Ramsaran's bronze sculptures are meant to represent African scarification and elements in nature, such as lighting and rain that mark the change in planting seasons and, that speak of a lost reverence for nature and its life-sustaining power.

The research for Ramsaran's older works involved extensive travel, over a thirty-year period, throughout Africa, Europe, Mexico, China, and Japan.  During the early 80's she traveled to Pietrasanta in Italy where she set up a small studio and spent several months casting in bronze. A few of the most pivotal moments in her research came when she visited Mexico (1982) where she observed the ancient sculpture and architecture of the Toltecs, Mayans, Zapotecs and Aztecs; Japan (1984) where she learned the delicate art of traditional Japanese papermaking or Washi while being apprenticed to the papermaker, Hiroyuki Fukunishi; and, in Zimbabwe (1987-1988) where she created a group of twenty stone carvings and bronze sculptures called Prehistoric Stamps that suggest the prehistoric origins of seeds, fossils, animals, and the Shona, Karanga and Ndebele people of the region.  The overwhelming presence of granite boulders, in Zimbabwe, adorned with prehistoric, red ochre paintings of warriors and animals would forever shape Helen's approach to her work going forward.

Similarly, after her experiences in Japan she created a series of experimental sculptures, in handmade paper called The Secret Myths.  These works represent enlarged amulets inscribed with brightly colored symbols from African mythology. The Sanctuary Group consists of a series of large bronze sculptures informed by an age-old initiation ritual of the Poro and other associations, which takes place in the deep sacred grove of trees in the Ivory Coast. These works were included in Ramsaran's solo show at the Chrysler Museum of Art and the Studio Museum in Harlem.  Ramasran's extensive research on the Dogon sacred sites in Mali informs her series of bronze sculpture that investigates the idea of the shrine as an actual place of refuge for the living and the deceased. This exploration into the idea of "house" was also an outgrowth of Ramsaran's research on African cosmology especially in the construction of houses.

In 1998, Ramsaran produced an art work entitled Kuca: A Well Worn Path. This path measured approximately 125 feet long and 18 to 24 inches wide and was composed of approximately 100 bronze segments linked together to form a serpentine design. In the language of the Batammaliba people, kuca refers to a path, often associated with the concept of a place. Ramsaran comments on the profound multi-layered meaning this word holds in relationship to her sculptures:

According to Suzanne Preston Blier, The Anatomy of Architecture, "Paths constitute a frequently used metaphor in the Batammaliba ceremony and thought. Paths are commonly used to refer to the idea of destiny (one's path in life), are closely identified with the idea of history (a path through time), are employed as a frequent reference to identity (each person follow his or her own distinct path), and are often used to suggest proper conduct (the correct path of behavior). In local ritual (among the Batammaliba) and symbolic contents, the path is seen to be that element that distinguishes and gives identity (a sense of place) to all living forms."

Ramsaran's recent series, executed in carved white clay, is not as intricate as the earlier works but they still communicate the same sophistication and physical tension.  These pieces are intended to represent the dying off of the coral reef and other life-sustaining systems due to the effects of climate change.

Solo exhibitions

2017
"Extinction: Signals of Alarm", Kenkeleba Gallery, New York, New York

2010
"A Significant Find", Maplewood Art Center, Maplewood, New Jersey

2002
"Dwellings: Real and Imagined", American Museum of Natural History, New York, New York.

2001
"The Spirit of a Woman", Cinque Gallery, New York, New York

1998
"Pathways and Shelters", Wilmer Jennings Gallery, New York, New York

1994
"Helen Evans Ramsaran", Solo Exhibition, Chrysler Museum of Art, Norfolk, Virginia
"Helen Evans Ramsaran", Solo Exhibition, Studio Museum in Harlem, New York, New York

1992
"Touchstones of Grace", Hughley Gallery, Atlanta, Georgia

1988
"Le Contes Visuels", La Fourmi Ailee Galerie, Paris, France

Selected two-person exhibitions

2002
"Windows of the Soul: Phoebe Beasley and Helen Ramsaran", Stella Jones Gallery, New Orleans, Louisiana

1996
"Masami Aihara and Helen Evans Ramsaran", Atagoyama Gallery, Tokyo, Japan

Group exhibitions

2016
"Essentia", Taller Boricua, New York, New York
"Herstory", Welancora Gallery, Brooklyn, New York

2014
"Art of the 5 Brooklyn", Interchurch Center, New York, NY 
"Facing the Rising Sun", Wilmer Jennings Gallery, New York, New York

2013
"50 Years/50 Gifts", Sheldon Museum of Art, Lincoln, Nebraska
"Its Surreal Thing", Sheldon Museum of Art, Lincoln, Nebraska

2009
"Twin Infinities", Abrons Art Center, New York, New York

2008
"African American Artists on Paper", State University of New York at Geneseo, Geneseo, New York
"Something to Look Forward To", HUB-Robeson Galleries, Penn State University, University Park, Pennsylvania
"Something to Look Forward To", Flint Institute of Arts, Flint, Michigan
"Something to Look Forward To", Morris Museum of Art, Augusta, Georgia

2007
"Back to the Future: Contemporary American Art from the Collection", Mead Art Museum, Amherst College, Amherst, Massachusetts

2006
"Something to Look Forward To", Beach Museum of Art, Kansas State University, Manhattan, Kansas
"Something to Look Forward To", California African American Museum, Los Angeles, California

2005
"Something to Look Forward To", The Heckscher Museum of Art, Huntington, New York
"Looking......Seeing?" Selected Alumni From the Artist-in-Residence Studio Space Program, Guest Curator, Suzanne Randolph, Abrons Art Center Gallery, New York, New York 
"Project Diversity 200", Corridor Gallery, Brooklyn, New York
"Contemporary Women Artists: New York", University Art Gallery, Indiana State University, Terre Haute, Indiana

2004
"Creating Their Own Image", Parsons Gallery, Parson School of Design, New York, New York
"Something to Look Forward To", Phillips Museum of Art, Franklin & Marshall College, Lancaster, Pennsylvania

2003
"For Love And Peace Of Mind: Contemporary Works of Art", One Good Thing Gallery, New York, New York
"Comfort Zones: Sculptural Solutions for the Spirit", TENRI Cultural Institute of New York, New York, New York

2002
"Paper 2003", Metaphor Contemporary Art, Brooklyn, New York
"Assembly/Line: Works by Twentieth-Century Sculptors", Mead Art Museum, Amherst, Massachusetts 
"LIFE - COLOR – FORM", Gallery Brocken, Tokyo, Japan
"Windows of the Soul", Phoebe Beasley and Helen Ramsaran, Stella Jones Gallery, New Orleans, Louisiana
"The Belles of Amherst: Contemporary Women Artists in the Collections of the Mead Art Museum and University Gallery of University of Massachusetts Amherst", Amherst, Massachusetts
"Helen Evans Ramsaran, Matt Burke, Eric Laxman, 2nd Annual Sculpture Show", Hopper House Art Center, Nyack, New York
"Transversing Cultures, Observations in Time and Space", Abrons Art Center, New York, New York

2001
"Nexus II: Paul Gardere, Helen Evans Ramsaran, Freddy Rodriguez", Skoto Gallery, New York, New York
"Roots and Wings: Entitled Black Women Artists", Cinque Gallery, New York, New York
"Renewal/Change: BWAC Outdoor Sculpture Show", Empire-Fulton Ferry, Brooklyn, New York
"Cities and Desire", The Rotunda Gallery, Brooklyn, New York

2000
"Selections", Skoto Gallery, New York, New York
"Unbound: Reshaping Artist's Books", Abrons Arts Center, New York, New York
"Generations II", AIR Gallery, New York, New York
"Public Voices/Private Visions", Rockland Center for the Arts, West Nyack, New York

1999
"Slave Routes: The Long Memory", Kenkeleba Gallery, New York, New York

1998
"Constructions in Multiple Hues", The Painted Bride Gallery, Philadelphia, Pennsylvania

1997
"Yari-Yari:  Visual Verbal Connections", Wilmer Jennings Gallery, New York, New York
"Six Sculptors", Long Island University, Brooklyn Campus, Brooklyn, New York		
"Four Women in Form",  Hostos Art Center, Bronx, New York
"Women in Full Effect", Rush Art Gallery, New York, New York

1996
"Open Studios", The International Studio Program, Tribeca, New York
"‘Til Spring Thaw: An Exhibition of Electric Environmental Works", Aquamarine Park and Sculpture Garden, New York, New York
"Tiny Multiples", Gallery 121 Henry, New York, New York
"African Influence/Contemporary Artists", National Civil Rights Museum, Memphis, Tennessee

1989
Salon des Artistes Independents, Grand Palais, Paris France
Prix d’Art Contemporain de Monte-Carlo, Musee Monaco, Monte Carlo, Monaco 
Group Exhibition of Sculpture, Brasil Inter-Art Galerie, Paris, France

1986
"Progressions: A Cultural Legacy", MoMA PS1, New York, New York

1982
The Wild Art Show", MoMA PS1, New York, New York

Grants
2003-04	The City University of New York Research Grant, The City University of New York Research Foundation, New York, New York
1996-97	The City University of New York Research Grant, The City University of New York Research Foundation, New York, New York
1994-95	The City University of New York Research Grant, The City University of New York Research Foundation, New York, New York
1993-94	The Elizabeth Foundation Grant, New York, New York
1985-86	The City University of New York Research Grant, The City University of New York Research Foundation, New York, New York
1984-85	Recipient of the Third World Artists Fellowship, New York, New York

Commissions, public sculptures and public projects
Sheldon Museum of Art,Sanctuary and Winged Moondance (2013)
Brooklyn Remembers, September 11 Memorial Project. Finalist, 2003–04, Brooklyn, New York
September 11 Memorial Project at Liberty Park, Invited Participant, 2004–05, Liberty Park, New Jersey
Mead Art Museum, Cliff Dwellers (2002), 19" x 22" x 3", Amherst, Massachusetts 
The Brown Capital Management Co. Inc., Pathway to Home (2000), 20" x 11" x 65", Baltimore, Maryland
Harlem School of the Arts, Dance of the Nightingales (1986), 6' x 2'x 2', New York, New York
John Jay College, A Silent Sentinel (1985), 3' x 5' x 10', New York, New York
John Jay College, Symbiotic Vision (1979), 22" x 18" x 4 1/2", New York, New York
The College of Staten Island, Wisdom's Key (1976), 4' x 4' x 9', Staten Island, New York

Public collections
Sheldon Museum of Art, Lincoln, Nebraska
Mead Art Museum, Amherst, Massachusetts
Brown Capital  Management Company, Baltimore, Maryland
Harlem School of the Arts, New York, New York
John Jay College, The City University of New York, New York, New York
College of Staten Island, The City University of New York, New York, New York
Johnson Publishing Company, Chicago, Illinois
Ohio State University, Columbus, Ohio
New Museum, New York, New York

References

External links
Contact Helen Ramsaran
About Skoto Gallery
Helen Ramsaran | MoMA
Welancora Gallery

Living people
Sculptors from Texas
Bowie State University faculty
21st-century American women artists
1943 births
African-American women artists
20th-century American women artists
American women sculptors
Florida A&M University faculty
City University of New York faculty
People from Bryan, Texas
Wax sculptures
American women academics
African-American sculptors
20th-century African-American women
20th-century African-American artists
21st-century African-American women
21st-century African-American artists